Grenzebach may stand for:

 Grenzebach (Schwalm), a river in Hesse, Germany, tributary of the Schwalm
 Obergrenzebach, a part of the community Frielendorf, Hesse, Germany
 Grenzebach BSH, a German company in the sector of wood processing, building materials and process technology